is a railway station in the city of Toyohashi, Aichi Prefecture, Japan, operated by Central Japan Railway Company (JR Tōkai).

Lines
Futagawa Station is served by the Tōkaidō Main Line, and is located 286.7 kilometers from the southern terminus of the line at Tokyo Station.

Station layout
The station has a two island platforms connected to the station building by a footbridge; however, track 1 is not in use. The station building has automated ticket machines, TOICA automated turnstiles and is staffed.

Platforms

Adjacent stations

|-
!colspan=5|Central Japan Railway Company

Station history
Futagawa Station was opened on April 7, 1896 on the Japanese Government Railway (JGR) Tōkaidō Line. The JGR became the JNR after World War II. Freight service was discontinued in 1971 and small parcel service from 1979. Along with the division and privatization of JNR on April 1, 1987, the station came under the control and operation of the Central Japan Railway Company. A new station building was completed from 2000-2002 (JR Tōkai). Automated turnstiles using the TOICA IC Card system came into operation from November 25, 2006.

Station numbering was introduced to the section of the Tōkaidō Line operated JR Central in March 2018; Futagawa Station was assigned station number CA41.

Passenger statistics
In fiscal 2017, the station was used by an average of 3110 passengers daily.

Surrounding area
Futagawa-juku

See also
 List of Railway Stations in Japan

References
Yoshikawa, Fumio. Tokaido-sen 130-nen no ayumi. Grand-Prix Publishing (2002) .

External links

Official home page

Railway stations in Japan opened in 1896
Railway stations in Aichi Prefecture
Tōkaidō Main Line
Stations of Central Japan Railway Company
Toyohashi